Ship of Fools (Modern German: , , original medieval German title) is a satirical allegory in German verse published in 1494  in Basel, Switzerland, by the humanist and theologian Sebastian Brant. It is the most famous treatment of the ship of fools trope and circulated in numerous translations.

Overview
The Ship of Fools was published in 1494 in Basel, Switzerland, by Sebastian Brant. It was printed by Michael Furter for Johann Bergann von Olpe. The book consists of a prologue, 112 brief satires, and an epilogue, all illustrated with woodcuts. Brant takes up the ship of fools trope, popular at the time, lashing with unsparing vigor the weaknesses and vices of his time.  He conceives Saint Grobian, whom he imagines to be the patron saint of vulgar and coarse people.

The concept of foolishness was a frequently used trope in the pre-Reformation period to legitimize criticism, as also used by Erasmus in his Praise of Folly and Martin Luther in his "" (Address to the Christian Nobility). Court fools were allowed to say much what they wanted; by writing his work in the voice of the fool, Brant could legitimize his criticism of the church. The abbot of Sponheim Johannes Trithemius lamented Brants title choice and would have preferred the book to be called Divina Satyra. He compared the work to Dante Alighieris Divina Commedia also for boths use of their local languages. The educator Jacob Wimpfeling deemed the book worthy to be taught with in school and Ulrich von Hutten praised Brant for his mixture of classical metrics with a barbarian dialect and the organization of the poetry in the Ship of Fools.  

The work immediately became extremely popular, being published in Reutlingen, Nuremberg, Strasbourg and Augsburg with six authorized and several unauthorized editions until 1512. Brant's own views on humanism and the new, revolutionary views on Christianity emerging in the sixteenth century are unclear. The debate still continues whether the Ship of Fools is itself a humanist work or just a remnant of Medieval sensibilities.

Of the 103 woodcuts, two thirds are attributed to the young Albrecht Dürer and the additional wood-cuts are the work of the so-called , the gnad-her-Meister and two other anonymous artists.

An allegorical painting by Hieronymus Bosch, The Ship of Fools, a fragment of a triptych said to have been painted by Bosch between 1490 and 1500, may have been influenced by the frontispiece for the book. It is on display in the Louvre Museum in Paris.

Modern interpretations
Some 20th-century artists including Art Hazelwood, István Orosz, Richard Rappaport, Brian Williams made images based on "Das Narrenschiff", or drew illustrations for contemporary editions of The Ship of Fools.

References

External links 

 "Narragonien digital" Digital Edition of 11 European Prints and Adaptations of the Ship of Fools before 1500 (University of Würzburg) 
 "Narragonia Latina". Hybrid edition of the Latin 'Ships of Fools' by Jakob Locher (1497) and Jodocus Badius (1505) with German translation and commentary (DFG project, 2021-2024, Univ. Würzburg).
Digitized version from the University of Houston, edition Basle 1498
Ship of Fools online exhibit, English adaptation, 1509 from the Glasgow University
Ship of Fools illustrations by István Orosz;  unavailable 23 Oct. 2017.

1494 books
Satirical books
Culture in Basel
Fictional ships
German-language books
German literature of the Late Middle Ages
Works about ships